Radio Melody  is a Bulgarian radio station, launched in 2007. It is part of Oberon Radio Max It airs only in Sofia and online. Its core audience is mainly older listeners and the station mainly plays music from the 1950s, 1960s, 1970s, 1980s and 1990s along with the best pop, classic Bulgarian and evergreen music.

Radio stations in Bulgaria
Mass media in Sofia

Radio stations established in 2007